Womp It Up! (stylized as WOMP It Up!) is a comedy podcast hosted by Jessica St. Clair and Lennon Parham, in character as high school student Marissa Wompler and her Stars program teacher Charlotte Listler. The podcast premiered on the Earwolf network in April 2015.

History
The characters of Marissa Wompler and Charlotte Listler originated on the Comedy Bang! Bang! podcast, with Wompler first appearing in 2010, and Listler joining her in 2012. After several Comedy Bang! Bang! appearances, Scott Aukerman suggested that the duo launch their own podcast. Other characters from Comedy Bang! Bang! have made appearances on WOMP It Up!, including Andy Daly's "Joe Bongo" and Paul F. Tompkins's "Mike the Janitor" characters.

We had been doing the Womptacular specials, where we would just get, like, every single person, and everyone would play, like, four different characters, and it was insanity from the get-go. Those were doing really well, and so then we thought, "Well, we could just do it the way we do our show," which is, every week we have another of our incredibly funny friends play something that they think would fit into the world.

— Lennon Parham

Episodes

References

Audio podcasts
Comedy and humor podcasts
Earwolf
2015 podcast debuts
Improvisational podcasts
American podcasts